James Bruce French (1921–2002) was a Canadian and American theoretical physicist, specializing in nuclear physics.

J. Bruce French received in 1942 his bachelor's degree in physics from Dalhousie University and served during WWII in the Royal Canadian Navy, performing acoustical studies related to antisubmarine warfare. He received his Ph.D. from MIT in 1948 with a thesis on relativistic calculation of the Lamb shift. From 1948 to 1950 French was a research associate at MIT. At the University of Rochester, he was from 1950 to 1951 a research fellow, from 1951 to 1956 an assistant professor, from 1956 to 1960 an associate professor, and from 1960 to 1992 a full professor, retiring in 1992 as professor emeritus.

He did pioneering research on deuteron stripping (direct reactions), the nuclear shell model, and statistical spectroscopy. He and his student Malcolm H. Macfarlane (1933–2008) published in 1960 the extensive review article Stripping reactions and the structure of light and intermediate nuclei, which has been cited over 700 times.

In the last stage of his career he did research on "development and application of central limit theorems on groups for studying the "smoothed" behavior of complicated quantum systems; and extended random-matrix and related methods for studying quantum chaos." He was a co-author of a highly cited review article on random-matrix physics, published in 1981.

J. Bruce French was the author or co-author of about 100 research articles and reviews. He was the thesis supervisor for 23 doctoral students. In April 1993 the University of Rochester held a symposium in his honor. He was predeceased by his wife and survived by a daughter and two sons.

References

American nuclear physicists
Canadian nuclear physicists
Dalhousie University alumni
Massachusetts Institute of Technology alumni
University of Rochester faculty
Fellows of the American Physical Society
1921 births
2002 deaths
Canadian emigrants to the United States